Makawanpurgadhi is a Rural municipality located within the Makawanpur District of the Bagmati Province of Nepal.
The rural municipality spans  of area, with a total population of 25,322 according to a 2011 Nepal census.

On March 10, 2017, the Government of Nepal restructured the local level bodies into 753 new local level structures.
The previous Makwanpurgadhi, Ambhanjyang, Sukaura and Budhichaur VDCs were merged to form Makawanpurgadhi Rural Municipality.
Makawanpurgadhi is divided into 8 wards, with Makwanpurgadhi VDC declared the administrative center of the rural municipality.

Demographics
At the time of the 2011 Nepal census, Makawanpurgadhi Rural Municipality had a population of 25,379. Of these, 58.7% spoke Tamang, 39.3% Nepali, 1.1% Magar, 0.4% Newar, 0.1% Gurung, 0.1% Maithili and 0.1% other languages as their first language.

In terms of ethnicity/caste, 59.4% were Tamang, 26.1% Hill Brahmin, 7.0% Chhetri, 2.3% Kami, 2.2% Magar, 1.4% Newar, 0.8% Damai/Dholi, 0.2% Gurung, 0.1% Chepang/Praja, 0.1% Sanyasi/Dasnami, 0.1% Sunuwar, 0.1% other Terai, 0.1% Thakuri and 0.2% others.

In terms of religion, 56.4% were Buddhist, 41.1% Hindu, 1.9% Christian and 0.6% others.

References

External links
official website of the rural municipality

Rural municipalities in Makwanpur District
Rural municipalities of Nepal established in 2017